Eduard Vallory (born in Barcelona, 1971) is a Catalan social analyst and change manager. He is the current Chairman of CATESCO (formerly UNESCOCAT, the Center for UNESCO of Catalonia), from which in 2016 he launched the three-years alliance for education change "Escola Nova 21".

Background
Vallory was the first director of the Barcelona Graduate School of Economics (2006–12). 

He is the author of the first academic research at global level on the World Scouting movement. The research was published in the 2012 book World Scouting: Educating for Global Citizenship.

Published works

References 

Living people
1971 births
Date of birth missing (living people)